Steve Hickner is an American animator and director at DreamWorks Animation. He is best known for directing DreamWorks animated films such as The Prince of Egypt and Bee Movie. He won the Critics' Choice Movie Award for Best Animated Feature and was also nominated for the Satellite Award for Best Animated or Mixed Media Feature for his work on The Prince of Egypt.

Early life 
Hickner's High School English teacher during the seventies was the first person to suggest he go into the animation profession. This inspired him to create an animated film after school, which he has described as "terrible" and moving "crazy fast." At first he desired to become a cartoonist, but later changed to become an animator, with his biggest influences being Walt Disney and the Warner Brothers. After High School he went to the New York University Film school where he studied Film Production B.F.A.

Career
While in school, Hickner contacted, and was hired by a man named dKay Wright. He spent over thirty-five years working at DreamWorks, Disney, Amblimation, Aardman, Hanna-Barbera and Filmation. He has produced the films, An American Tail: Fievel Goes West, We're Back! A Dinosaur's Story and Balto. His directing credits include Bee Movie and The Prince of Egypt. He also contributed to Who Framed Roger Rabbit, The Little Mermaid, The Great Mouse Detective, Madagascar, Shrek Forever After, Mr. Peabody & Sherman and Home. Steve has contributed to location-based entertainment projects in Singapore, Dubai, China, London, and Hollywood. He has been a guest speaker at many colleges and universities, film festivals and animation events. Also, he wrote the books Animation Rules! 52 Ways to Achieve Creative Success and Animating Your Career.

Filmography

Television

Film

Internet

References

External links
 

Living people
American film directors
American storyboard artists
American animators
American animated film directors
DreamWorks Animation people
Year of birth missing (living people)